Bruce Dickson (17 October 1932 – 13 December 2006) was an Australian rower. He competed in the men's coxed pair event at the 1956 Summer Olympics.

References

1932 births
2006 deaths
Australian male rowers
Olympic rowers of Australia
Rowers at the 1956 Summer Olympics
Place of birth missing
20th-century Australian people